This is a list of records of the UEFA Women's Championship and its qualification matches.

General statistics by tournament

Teams: tournament position
Teams having equal quantities in the tables below are ordered by the tournament the quantity was attained in (the teams that attained the quantity first are listed first). If the quantity was attained by more than one team in the same tournament, these teams are ordered alphabetically.

 Most titles won 8,  (1989, 1991, 1995, 1997, 2001, 2005, 2009, 2013).
 Most finishes in the top two 9,  (1989, 1991, 1995, 1997, 2001, 2005, 2009, 2013, 2022).
 Most finishes in the top four 10,  (1989, 1991, 1993, 1995, 1997, 2001, 2005, 2009, 2013, 2022).

Consecutive
 Most consecutive championships 6,  (1995–2013).
 Most consecutive finishes in the top two 6,  (1995–2013).
 Most consecutive finishes in the top four 9,  (1989–2013).
 Most consecutive appearances in the finals 12,  (1987–2022).

Gaps
 Longest gap between successive titles 6 years,  (1987–1993).
 Longest gap between successive appearances in the top two 25 years,  (1984–2009).
 Longest gap between successive appearances in the top four 14 years,  (1995–2009).
 Longest gap between successive appearances in the finals 16 years,  (1997-2013).

Host team

Defending champion
 Best finish by defending champion Champion:  (1991, 1997, 2001, 2005, 2009, 2013).

Debuting teams

Other
 Most finishes in the top two without ever being champion 2,  (1993, 1997).
 Most finishes in the top four without ever being champion 6,  (1984-1993, 1997).
 Most appearances without ever being champion 12,  (1984-1993, 1997-2022).
 Most appearances without ever finishing in the top two 7,  (1997-2022).
 Most appearances without ever finishing in the top four 5,  (1997-2001, 2009-2017).
 Teams that overcame tournament champion , 2013 (1–0 vs Germany).
 Most played final 4,  vs  (1989, 1991, 2005, 2013).
 Most played match 10,  vs  (1989, 1991, 1997, 2001, 2005 (2x), 2009 (2x), 2013 (2x)).

Coaches: tournament position
 Most championships 3, Gero Bisanz (1989–1991, 1995) and Tina Theune (1997–2005).
 Most finishes in the top two 3, Gero Bisanz (1989–1991, 1995); Tina Theune (1997–2005); Even Pellerud (1991–1993, 2013).
 Most finishes in the top four 4, Gero Bisanz (1989–1995); Sergio Guenza (1989–1993, 1997); Even Pellerud (1991–1995, 2013).

Teams: matches played and goals scored

All time
 Most matches played 46, .
 Most wins 36, .
 Fewest wins 0, .
 Most losses 20, .
 Fewest losses 2, .
 Most draws 8, .
 Most goals scored 107, .
 Most goals conceded 63, .
 Fewest goals scored 1, .
 Fewest goals conceded 4, .
 Highest goal difference +80, .
 Lowest goal difference -25, .

In one tournament
 Most wins 6,  (2009),  (2017),  (2022).
 Most goals scored 22, 2022.
 Most goals scored, group stage 14, 2022.
 Most goals scored, champions 22, 2022.
 Most goals scored, hosts 22, 2022.
 Fewest goals scored, champions 2, 1993.
 Fewest goals scored, hosts 1, 1993.
 Most goals conceded, champions 5, 2009.
 Fewest goals conceded, champions 0, 1993.

Streaks
 Most consecutive wins 19, from 2–0 vs Denmark (1997) to 6–2 vs England (2009).
 Most consecutive matches without a loss 26, from 4–1 vs England (1995) to 3–0 vs Iceland (2013).
 Most consecutive losses 6, from 0–5 vs Germany (2001) to 1–3 vs France (2013).
 Most consecutive matches without a win 12, from 1–2 vs Sweden (1997) to 1–1 vs Spain (2013).
 Most consecutive Top-scoring team 3,  (2001–2009).

Individual
 Most championships 5, Birgit Prinz (1995-2009) and Nadine Angerer (1997-2013). 
 Most medals 5, Heidi Støre (1987-1995); Birgit Prinz (1995-2009); Nadine Angerer (1997-2013).
 Most matches played, final tournaments 23, Birgit Prinz (1995-2009).
 Most matches played, including qualifying 61, Gillian Coultard (1981-2000).
 Most knockout games played, final tournaments 11, Doris Fitschen (1989-2001) and Birgit Prinz (1995-2009).
 Most appearances in a championship final 5, Birgit Prinz (1995-2009).
 Most appearances as captain 11, Katrine Pedersen (2005-2013).
 Most tournaments as captain 5, Heidi Støre (1987-1995).
 Youngest player , Oksana Yakovyshyn, vs Netherlands, 23 August 2009.
 Oldest player , Sandrine Soubeyrand, vs Denmark, 22 July 2013.
 Oldest captain , Sandrine Soubeyrand, vs Denmark, 22 July 2013.
 Largest age difference on the same team , 2009, .

Goalscoring

Individual

 Most goals scored, final tournaments 10, Inka Grings (1997–2009) and Birgit Prinz (1995–2009).
 Most goals scored, qualifying 37, Margrét Lára Viðarsdóttir (2003–2019).
 Most goals scored, final tournaments and qualifying 42, Carolina Morace (1984–1997).
 Most goals scored in a tournament 6, Inka Grings (2009), Beth Mead (2022) and Alexandra Popp (2022).
 Most goals scored in a match 4, Marianne Pettersen, vs Denmark, 1997.
 Most goals scored in a qualifying match 7, María Paz Vilas, vs Kazakhstan, 2013.
 Most goals scored in all final matches 5, Birgit Prinz, 1 vs Sweden in 1995, 1 vs Italy in 1997, 1 vs Norway in 2005 & 2 vs England in 2009.
 Most matches with at least one goal 9, Birgit Prinz (1995–2009).
 Most consecutive matches with at least one goal 5, Alexandra Popp (2022).
 Most matches with at least two goals 3, Heidi Mohr (1991, 1995) and Inka Grings (2005–2009).
 Fastest hat-trick 18 minutes, Lena Videkull, scored at 59', 61' and 76', vs Norway, 1995.
 Fastest hat-trick from kickoff 45 minutes, Grace Geyoro, scored at 9', 40' and 45', vs Italy, 2022.
 Most tournaments with at least one goals 5, Birgit Prinz (1995–2009).
 Most tournaments with at least two goals 4, Birgit Prinz (1995-1997, 2005-2009).
 Most tournaments with at least three goals 2, Inka Grings (2005-2009).
 Most tournaments with at least four goals 2, Inka Grings (2005-2009).
 Longest period between a player's first and last goals : Birgit Prinz (23 February 1995 – 10 September 2009).
 Longest period between one goal and the next : Linda Sällström (3 September 2009 – 8 July 2022).
 Youngest goalscorer , Isabell Herlovsen, vs France, 9 June 2005.
 Youngest hat-trick scorer , Marianne Pettersen, vs Denmark, 30 June 1997.
 Youngest goalscorer, final , Birgit Prinz, vs Sweden, 26 March 1995.
 Oldest goalscorer , Julie Nelson, vs Norway, 7 July 2022.
 Oldest hat-trick scorer , Lena Videkull, vs Norway, 5 March 1995.
 Oldest goalscorer, final , Birgit Prinz, vs England, 10 September 2009.
 Fastest goal from kickoff in a final 6th minute, Malin Andersson, vs Germany, 1995.
 Latest goal from kickoff in a final 98th minute, Claudia Müller, vs Sweden, 2001.

Team
 Biggest margin of victory 8,  (8) vs  (0), 2022.
 Biggest margin of victory, qualifying match 17,  (17) vs  (0), 1995 Group 7;  (17) vs  (0), 1997 Group 1;  (17) vs  (0), 2013 Group 2.
 Most goals scored in a match, one team 8,  vs , 2022.
 Most goals scored in a final, both teams 8,  (6) vs  (2), 2009.
 Most goals in a tournament, one team 22, 2022.
 Most individual goalscorers for one team, one tournament 10, 2009 (Fatmire Bajramaj, Melanie Behringer, Linda Bresonik, Inka Grings, Annike Krahn, Kim Kulig, Simone Laudehr, Anja Mittag, Célia Okoyino da Mbabi, Birgit Prinz).
 Fewest individual goalscorers for one team, one tournament, champions 2, 1993 (Birthe Hegstad, Anne Nymark Andersen).

Tournament
 Most goals scored in a tournament 95 goals, 2022.
 Fewest goals scored in a tournament 8 goals, 1993.
 Most goals per match in a tournament 5 goals per match, 1995.
 Fewest goals per match in a tournament 2 goals per match, 1993.
 Most players scoring at least two goals in a tournament 16, 2009.
 Most players scoring at least three goals in a tournament 5, 2005, 2009 and 2022.
 Most players scoring at least four goals in a tournament 3, 1997 and 2022.
 Most players scoring at least five goals in a tournament 2, 2022 - Beth Mead and Alexandra Popp.
 Most players scoring at least six goals in a tournament 2, 2022 - Beth Mead and Alexandra Popp.

Top-scoring teams by tournament
 1984: , 6 goals
 1989: , 5 goals
 1991: , 6 goals
 1993: , 3 goals
 1997: , 7 goals
 2001: , 13 goals
 2005: , 15 goals
 2009: , 21 goals
 2013: , 13 goals
 2017: , 13 goals
 2022: , 22 goals

Teams listed in bold won the tournament.

Goalkeeping
 Most matches played, finals 17: Hedvig Lindahl (2005–2009, 2017-2022).
 Most clean sheets (matches without conceding) 11: Silke Rottenberg (1997–2005).
 Most goals conceded, one tournament 14, Rachel Brown (2009).
 Fewest goals conceded, one tournament, champions 0, Reidun Seth (1993).
 Youngest goalkeeper : Eva Russo, vs Sweden, 8 April 1984.
 Oldest goalkeeper : Hedvig Lindahl, vs England, 26 July 2022.

Coaching

 Most matches coached 15, Tina Theune (1997–2005) and Hope Powell (2001–2013).
 Most matches won 13, Tina Theune (1997–2005).
 Most matches lost 8, Hope Powell (2001–2013).
 Foreign championship  Sarina Wiegman (2022).
 Most tournaments 4, Gero Bisanz (1989–1995), Sergio Guenza (1989–1993, 1997), Even Pellerud (1991–1995, 2013), Hope Powell (2001–2013).
 Youngest coach , Hope Powell, vs Russia, 2001.
 Youngest coach, champions , Even Pellerud, vs Italy, 1993.
 Oldest coach , Kenny Shiels, vs England, 2022.
 Oldest coach, champions , Gero Bisanz, vs Sweden, 1995.

Discipline
 Most sendings off (tournament) 2, 2001 (in 15 matches); 2017 and 2022 (in 31 matches).
 Most cautions (tournament) 90, 2017 (in 31 matches).

Attendance
 Highest attendance in a match 87,192,  vs , 31 July 2022, Wembley, London, United Kingdom, 2022.
 Highest attendance in a final 87,192,  vs , 31 July 2022, Wembley, London, United Kingdom, 2022.
 Highest attendance in a qualifying match 24,835,  vs , 3 June 2016, Roazhon Park, Rennes, France, 2017 Group 3.
 Highest average of attendance per match 18,544, 2022, hosted by England.
 Highest attendance in a tournament 574,865, 2022, hosted by England.
 Lowest attendance in a tournament 11,500, 1993, hosted by Italy.

Total and average attendance

Penalty shootouts
 Most shootouts, team, all-time 4, .
 Most shootouts, all teams, tournament 2, 2013 and 2017.
 Most successful kicks, shootout, one team 8, vs Denmark, 1991.
 Most successful kicks, shootout, both teams 15,  (8) vs  (7), 1991.
 Most successful kicks, team, all-time 13,  (in 3 shootouts).
 Most successful kicks, team, tournament 8, 1991 (in 1 shootouts).
 Most successful kicks, all teams, tournament 15, 1991 (in 1 shootouts).

References

Records
International women's association football competition records and statistics